Methallenestril (brand names Cur-men, Ercostrol, Geklimon, Novestrine, Vallestril), also known as methallenoestril and as methallenestrol, as well as Horeau's acid, is a synthetic nonsteroidal estrogen and a derivative of allenolic acid and allenestrol (specifically, a methyl ether of it) that was formerly used to treat menstrual issues but is now no longer marketed. It is a seco-analogue of bisdehydrodoisynolic acid, and although methallenestril is potently estrogenic in rats, in humans it is only weakly so in comparison. Vallestril was a brand of methallenestril issued by G. D. Searle & Company in the 1950s. Methallenestril is taken by mouth. By the oral route, a dose of 25 mg methallenestril is approximately equivalent to 1 mg diethylstilbestrol, 4 mg dienestrol, 20 mg hexestrol, 25 mg estrone, 2.5 mg conjugated estrogens, and 0.05 mg ethinylestradiol.

See also
 Carbestrol
 Fenestrel
 Doisynoestrol
 Doisynolic acid

References

Abandoned drugs
Carboxylic acids
Naphthalenes
Synthetic estrogens